Isser or Issur is a given name and surname. Notable people with this name include:

Given name 
 Isser Be'eri (1901–1958), Israeli director of military intelligence
 Issur Demsky or Kirk Douglas (1916–2020), American actor
 Isser Harel (1912–2003), Israeli spymaster
 Isser Zalman Meltzer (1870–1953), Lithuanian Orthodox rabbi and scholar
 Isser Yehuda Unterman (1886–1976), Ashkenazi Chief Rabbi of Israel
 Isser Woloch (born 1937), historian of the French Revolution

Surname 
Aharon Isser (1958–1995), Israeli aeronautical engineer
Franz Isser (born 1932), Austrian bobsledder
Fritz Isser, Austrian bobsledder
Heinrich Isser (1928–2004), Austrian bobsledder
Josef Isser, Austrian luger
Maria Isser (1929–2011), Austrian luger
Paul Isser, Austrian luger